The Dr. J. W. S. Gallagher House is a 1913 Prairie School house in Winona, Minnesota, United States, designed by the architectural firm of Purcell & Elmslie. The house was listed on the National Register of Historic Places in 1984 for having local significance in the theme of architecture.

Description
The Dr. J. W. S. Gallagher House is essentially rectangular, with a gabled porch on the side and another on the rear. It is two stories with side gables, a low-pitched roof, and wide eaves. The house has stucco walls with cypress trim. Architectural details include a five-sided bay window on the northeast corner, sawn wood decorations, and came glasswork windows. It was nominated for being a well-preserved example of the modest residential commissions that typified Purcell & Elmslie's work, despite their acclaim for more prominent projects such as Merchants National Bank in downtown Winona.

See also
 National Register of Historic Places listings in Winona County, Minnesota

References

External links

1913 establishments in Minnesota
Buildings and structures in Winona, Minnesota
Houses completed in 1913
Houses in Winona County, Minnesota
Houses on the National Register of Historic Places in Minnesota
National Register of Historic Places in Winona County, Minnesota
Prairie School architecture in Minnesota
Purcell and Elmslie buildings